Harlansburg may refer to:

Harlansburg, Indiana
Harlansburg, Pennsylvania